The 2011–12 PBA Philippine Cup Finals was the best-of-7 championship series of the 2011–12 PBA Philippine Cup, and the conclusion of the conference's playoffs. The Talk 'N Text Tropang Texters and the Powerade Tigers competed for the 104th championship contested by the league. The series was held from January 20 to 29, 2012.

This was the first time that Talk 'N Text and Powerade faced each other in the finals, since the 2003 PBA All-Filipino Cup, in which Talk 'N Text won the series in six games.

Talk 'N Text won the championship series, four games to one, becoming the third team, and first since 1985, to successfully defend the All-Filipino crown.

Background

Road to the finals

Talk 'N Text finished the elimination round tied with the B-Meg Llamados for first place. Since Talk 'N Text has an inferior quotient against B-Meg, the team got the #2 seed but still got the twice-to-beat advantage entering the quarterfinals. They defeated the 7th seeded Barako Bull Energy in one game in order to advance to the semifinals, where they faced the Petron Blaze Boosters, the team that they faced during the 2011 PBA Governors Cup Finals and denied them their opportunity for a Grand Slam. Talk 'N Text defeated Petron Blaze in seven games, becoming the third team to win a best-of-seven playoff series coming from a 1–3 deficit.

Powerade on the other hand was seeded eight (due to an inferior quotient against Barako Bull), with a twice-to-beat disadvantage going to the quarterfinals. They defeated the first seeded B-Meg Llamados in two games to advance to the semifinals. In the next round, they faced the fifth-seeded Rain or Shine Elasto Painters. Powerade won in seven games, making them the first team in PBA history to become the lowest seeded team to advance to the finals.

Series summary

Game 1

In the first game, which is held at Digos, Davao del Sur, Talk 'N Text capitalized on the absence of Powerade's top pick rookie JV Casio, due to an injured knee, and limiting Gary David to only 19 points (his lowest scoring output in the playoffs) to get the first win of the series. The Tropang Texters led Powerade by as much  as 20 points mostly in the second half.

Game 2

Talk 'N Text was in control most of the game  and was leading Powerade by 12 points going into the fourth quarter. The Tigers, led by Doug Kramer sparked a 13–2 run, which pushed Powerade to within one point, 94–93 with 2:54 remaining in the game. After executing empty possessions, Larry Fonacier was able to score a layup from a broken play that gave the Tropang Texters with 2:08 remaining. Jimmy Alapag sealed any chance for a Powerade comeback with a 28-foot three point jumper.

Game 3

With 3.3 seconds left in the game, and leading the game 121–118, Talk 'N Text had the possession and a chance to close the game. Ranidel de Ocampo miscalculated the lead pass to teammate Larry Fonacier, who was heavily defended by Gary David. JV Casio was able to pick up the loose ball then sank a three-point shot to send the game into overtime. During the overtime period, De Ocampo was able to make up his mistake in regulation, scoring the crucial shots in overtime, sealing the game and a commanding 3–0 lead in the finals series.

Earlier in the game, De Ocampo was slapped with a flagrant foul (penalty 1) after he swung an elbow to Sean Anthony after securing a rebound. Anthony's eyebrow needed 10 stitches to stop the bloody gash. De Ocampo was fined P20,000 by the commissioner's office after the incident.

Game 4

Before Game 4 started, Powerade's Gary David was named Best Player of the Conference after receiving 1268 value points against his closest contender Arwind Santos with 1159.

Scoring with a game-high 35 points, Gary David led Powerade to its first win in the series, amid costly miscues at the last minutes of the game, preventing a potential Talk 'N Text sweep.

Game 5

Talk 'N Text led most of the game, leading with as much as 23 points (40–17) and prevented any scoring surge from Powerade. The Tropang Texters was able to secure the series clinching game, successfully defending the Philippine Cup, making them the first team in league history to win back-to-back All-Filipino championships after 27 years. The last team doing that feat was the Great Taste Coffee Makers in 1984 and 1985.

Ryan Reyes also made history by making 10 steals and breaking the all-time PBA record for most steals made in a single game.

After the game, Larry Fonacier was awarded as the Finals Most Valuable Player by the PBA Press Corps.

Rosters

Broadcast notes

References

External links
PBA official website

2011–12 PBA season
2012
PBA Philippine Cup Finals 2012
TNT Tropang Giga games
Powerade Tigers games
PBA Philippine Cup Finals